Alexander Findlay (25 November 1844 – 2 February 1921) was a Scottish Liberal Party politician and industrialist. He founded Alexander Findlay & Company, a structural engineering company based at Parkneuk Works, Motherwell, in 1888. A prominent figure in local business and political life, he served as Provost of Motherwell 1901–1904. He was elected as the Member of Parliament (MP) for North East Lanarkshire at a by-election in 1904, and was re-elected in 1906. He stood down at the January 1910 general election.

References

External links 
 

1844 births
1921 deaths
Scottish Liberal Party MPs
Members of the Parliament of the United Kingdom for Scottish constituencies
UK MPs 1906–1910
UK MPs 1900–1906